(born August 24, 1975) also known as , is a Japanese mixed martial artist. A professional competitor since 1996, he has formerly competed for the UFC, PRIDE, DREAM, Shooto, Vale Tudo Japan, DEEP, and participated in the Yarennoka!, Dynamite!! 2008, Dynamite!! 2009, Dynamite!! 2010, and Fight For Japan: Genki Desu Ka Omisoka 2011 events. Sakurai finished second (Silver) in the Absolute Class (no weight limit) ADCC Submission Wrestling World Championship in 1999 at just under 77 kg. During the height of his career in 2000 and 2001 he was considered to be one of the top pound for pound fighters in MMA. He is the former Shooto Middleweight Champion.

His nickname, "Mach", pronounced ma-ha in Japanese was taken as a tribute to his childhood professional wrestling hero, Higo Shigehisashi better known as Mach Hayato, the first Japanese professional wrestler to completely embrace the Mexican style of lucha libre and was also among the group of professional wrestlers who made the transition to shoot wrestling as part of the original UWF movement.

He holds notable victories over Daiju Takase and Luciano Azevedo, who in turn hold victories against Anderson Silva and Jose Aldo respectively.

Background
Sakurai began training in judo during middle school, gaining several championships and then also began training in karate. During high school, he became friends with fellow combat sportsmen Michihiro Omigawa and Kazuyuki Miyata. He later became interested in shootboxing and joined Caesar Takeshi's dojo, competing for his promotion during years. In 1996, he wandered in mixed martial arts and entered Kiguchi Dojo, where he trained with Noriaki Kiguchi and Satoru Sayama's apprentice Noboru Asahi. At the end, he ended joining the Shooto organization along with a young Takanori Gomi.

Mixed martial arts career

Shooto
Joining Naoki Sakurada's Gutsman team, Sakurai made his professional debut in Shooto on October 4, 1996 by submitting Caol Uno. Over the next five years he would go undefeated in eighteen bouts, representing the promotion in three consecutive victories at the renowned Vale Tudo Japan event, as well as French MMA promotion Golden Trophy 1999. Hayato would also win that organization's Shooto Middleweight Champion from Jutaro Nakao, which he defended before Tetsuji Kato.

In a less official light, he contended with Rumina Sato for the fastest victory at the time, knocking out Ademir Oliveira with a spectacular flying knee in 0:34 seconds moments before Sato beat him with a flying armbar in 0:08 against Charles Diaz.

During his final times on the company, Sakurai also faced future UFC challenger Frank Trigg in an exciting battle. The two brawled in the clinch, with Trigg landing knees while Hayato threw punches and kicks to the body and leg; at one instance, Trigg almost knocked out Sakurai, stunning him and landing multiple undefended punches both standing and on the ground which drew blood. Trigg continued dominating through the second round, until Sakurai finally came back knocking him down with a left hook, and he managed to finish the fight with multiple knee strikes to the face, winning by KO.

In August 2001, Sakurai was finally defeated by future longtime UFC Middleweight Champion Anderson Silva, losing his championship title. After the loss, and subsequent to a severe car accident, Sakurai stopped fighting for Shooto full-time.

Ultimate Fighting Championship
On March 22, 2002, Sakurai stepped into Ultimate Fighting Championship to fight the UFC Welterweight Champion Matt Hughes at UFC 36. Hughes started the match taking down Sakurai repeatedly, but Sakurai worked submission attempts from the bottom and managed to capture Hughes's back. The second round saw Hayato landing a solid left hand and a knee to the head, which Hughes got back on the third by slamming Sakurai hard on the mat with a takedown and landing several strikes on the ground. The fourth would see the final action, with Hughes managing to knock down Sakurai and perform ground and pound until the referee stopped the fight as a TKO in favor of Hughes.

PRIDE
After losing to Hughes, Sakurai fought periodically in Shooto and DEEP before joining PRIDE Fighting Championships, Japan's largest MMA organization. During this time he was inconsistent in his performances, often losing to much lower-ranked opponents. Some speculated Sakurai's seeming loss of spirit and mental focus came from his infamous car accident he suffered after fighting Silva.

Sakurai made an underwhelming debut before Daiju Takase in PRIDE Shockwave 2003. Takase controlled a part of the first round, taking down Sakurai and bloodying his nose with punches. At this point, however, Mach started coming back, hijacking the standing segments with superior striking and negating Takase's submission attempts in order to do damage through his guard. The Shooto fighter ended the fight taking down Takase several times and controlling the action, which gained him a unanimous decision.

In his next apparitions for PRIDE Bushido, Sakurai would face two members of the Gracie family, Rodrigo and Crosley, but he was unsuccessful in both ventures. He fought an uneventful match against the former, stopping him from passing guard for the first round and being stopped himself from passing guard in the second, before receiving some knees to the head which gained Gracie the decision; and he then lost by submission to the latter, despite him showing a better performance until the last minutes.

In 2005 Sakurai regained focus and went to the US to train with legendary Pancrase coach Matt Hume. Despite his revered and legendary early career some questioned if Sakurai could make an impact in the division. Sakurai silenced his critics when he defeated former UFC Lightweight Champion Jens Pulver and former Shooto Lightweight Champion Joachim Hansen on the same night to advance to the tournament finals.

The match with Pulver was specially acclaimed, as it featured high speed and an exciting give and take. Sakurai peppered his opponent with strikes and kicks before receiving a left hand which seemed to put him down. He recovered and injured Pulver's eye with a combo, only to immediately land a front kick directly to the same eye, but then Hayato received another sudden left hook, which anticipated a possible finish. However, for a second time, Sakurai came back and pressed action, finally bringing him down with a body shot and a knee strike for the TKO. The bout was called "awesome" and "Fight of the Year Contender-level" by analyst Scott Newman. Similarly back and forth would be the fight against Hansen: the two fighters exchanged strikes, hip throws and leglocks through the entire bout, while Sakurai landed spinning back kicks and a close armbar attempt. Sakurai got the decision win, and it set off a match in the finals against Takanori Gomi, Sakurai's former colleague and training partner.

On December 31, 2005 Sakurai fought Gomi for the first ever PRIDE Fighting Championships  championship of the world. Although fighting with a torn ACL he suffered in training just three weeks prior to the fight, though this was not known outside of his coaching circle at the time, Sakurai initially had the upper-hand, pounding Gomi with brutal inside-leg kicks. A few minutes into the round Sakurai attempted a judo throw, but the ring ropes got in the way and caused him to crash head first on the mat with Gomi taking his back. Takanori capitalized and rained down punches on him, and although Sakurai was able to return to his feet, he was overwhelmed and knocked out with a punching combo.

Despite the loss to Gomi, Sakurai would continue to impress with his performances. At Bushido 11 he scored a brutal knockout over WEC veteran Olaf Alfonso. On August 26, 2006, Mach fought Brazilian Luciano Azevedo at Bushido 12. After several minutes of attempted ground and pound by Azevedo, the fighters were stood back up. Mach then consistently stuffed Azevedo's takedowns, and landed a fight-ending knee on Azevedo over his left eye. The fight was stopped, TKO by cut.

Sakurai fought against former King of the Cage Lightweight Champion and future The Ultimate Fighter 6 Winner Mac Danzig at PRIDE 33. Sakurai won the fight via knockout in the second round. Sakurai was then defeated by David Baron by submission in the first round. Sakurai then defeated Kuniyoshi Hironaka via unanimous decision. Sakurai then went on to defeat professional wrestler Katsuyori Shibata by TKO at Dynamite!! 2008. In a shocking start, Shibata charged across the ring and almost fell through the ropes when Sakurai dodged him, and then unloaded all his offensive with the intention to end the fight early, but Hayato took him down and punished him methodically until the stoppage.

DREAM
After PRIDE's folding, Sakurai joined its offshoot promotion DREAM, in whose Welterweight Grand Prix he took part. He faced top-ranked lightweight Shinya Aoki at DREAM 8 in a match with revenge overtones, as Sakurai had defeated Aoki back in Shooto in what was called a controversial decision. This time, Sakurai won in impressive fashion, sweeping over a charging Aoki and delivering knees to the head and punches for a KO at 0:27. He then lost at DREAM 10 in the semi-final of the tournament to eventual winner Marius Zaromskis in a huge upset, conceding the loss via knockout from a head kick and punches.

At Dynamite!! 2009 New Year's Eve show in Saitama, Sakurai fought against another Shooto legend, Akihiro Gono. Sakurai controlled the fight early on, outstriking Gono both standing and from the half guard, but eventually lost via armbar submission in the second round. He fought Nick Diaz at DREAM 14 and was caught in an armbar submission again. After this fight he has speculated on retiring saying that he was good physically, but not mentally.

Sakurai was to have a rematch against Marius Žaromskis in DREAM 17 a non-title fight. However, he injured his leg which has forced off of the DREAM 17 card and was replaced by Eiji Ishikawa.

Sakurai returned at Fight For Japan: Genki Desu Ka Omisoka 2011 where he faced Ryo Chonan. He won the fight via unanimous decision.

He then faced Phil Baroni at the subsequent New Year's card by Dream, DREAM 18, defeating him via unanimous decision.

Post-DREAM
Almost a year later, Sakurai returned to face Jae Suk Lim at Mach Dojo / Gladiator: Mach Festival. Sakurai lost by TKO in the first round.

He competed in the Tokyo International Jiu-Jitsu Open Championship 2009, ranking himself as a Brazilian jiu-jitsu black belt for his grappling expertise. He opened the first round against Akira Uemura, but was eliminated.

Rizin FF
After not competing in over three years, Sakurai made his MMA return for Rizin Fighting Federation.  He faced Wataru Sakata at Rizin World Grand-Prix 2016: Final Round on December 31, 2016 and won the fight via TKO in the second round.

Fighting style
Sakurai was renowned for his well rounded set of skills, excelling on every field of the MMA game. On the stand-up, he favored grinding low kicks and technical boxing along with a wide usage of knee strikes, including flying knees. A prolific clinch user, although he is not a high level judoka, Sakurai excelled in performing hip throws during his matches, favouring o goshi, uki goshi and ippon seoi nage. Finally, his grappling technique was one of his biggest strengths, using his shoot wrestling expertise to great effect. He was the only user of this discipline in reaching the ADCC finals both in his weight and absolute division, defeating heavier and more decorated grapplers like Ricco Rodriguez and Vinny Magalhães.

Championships and accomplishments
 DREAM 
 2009 DREAM Welterweight Grand Prix Semifinalist
 PRIDE Fighting Championships 
 2005 PRIDE Lightweight Grand Prix Runner-Up
 Shooto
 Shooto Welterweight Championship (One Time)

Mixed martial arts record

|-
| Win
| align=center|38–13–2
| Wataru Sakata
| TKO (punches)
| Rizin World Grand-Prix 2016: Final Round
| 
| align=center|2
| align=center|12:37
| Saitama, Japan
| 
|-
| Loss
| align=center| 37–13–2
| Jae Suk Lim
| TKO (punches)
| Mach Dojo / Gladiator: Mach Festival
| 
| align=center| 1
| align=center| 5:21
| Tokyo, Japan
|
|-
| Win
| align=center| 37–12–2
| Phil Baroni
| Decision (unanimous)
| DREAM 18
| 
| align=center| 3
| align=center| 5:00
| Tokyo, Japan
| 
|-
| Win
| align=center| 36–12–2
| Ryo Chonan
| Decision (unanimous)
| Fight For Japan: Genki Desu Ka Omisoka 2011
| 
| align=center| 3
| align=center| 5:00
| Saitama, Japan
| 
|-
| Loss
| align=center| 35–12–2
| Jason High
| Decision (split)
| Dynamite!! 2010
| 
| align=center| 3
| align=center| 5:00
| Saitama, Japan
| 
|-
| Loss
| align=center| 35–11–2
| Nick Diaz
| Submission (armbar)
| DREAM 14
| 
| align=center| 1
| align=center| 3:54
| Saitama, Japan
| 
|-
| Loss
| align=center| 35–10–2
| Akihiro Gono
| Submission (armbar)
| Dynamite!! The Power of Courage 2009
| 
| align=center| 2
| align=center| 3:56
| Saitama, Japan
| 
|-
| Loss
| align=center| 35–9–2
| Marius Žaromskis
| KO (head kick)
| DREAM 10
| 
| align=center| 1
| align=center| 4:03
| Saitama, Japan
| 
|-
| Win
| align=center| 35–8–2
| Shinya Aoki
| KO (knees & punches)
| DREAM 8
| 
| align=center| 1
| align=center| 0:27
| Nagoya, Japan
| 
|-
| Win
| align=center| 34–8–2
| Katsuyori Shibata
| TKO (punches)
| Fields Dynamite!! 2008
| 
| align=center| 1
| align=center| 7:01
| Saitama, Japan
| 
|-
| Win
| align=center| 33–8–2
| Kuniyoshi Hironaka
| Decision (unanimous)
| Dream 6: Middleweight Grand Prix 2008 Final Round
| 
| align=center| 2
| align=center| 5:00
| Saitama, Japan
| 
|-
| Loss
| align=center| 32–8–2
| David Baron
| Submission (guillotine choke)
| Shooto: Shooto Tradition 1
| 
| align=center| 1
| align=center| 4:50
| Tokyo, Japan
| 
|-
| Win
| align=center| 32–7–2
| Hidetaka Monma
| TKO (punches)
| Dream 1: Lightweight Grand Prix 2008 First Round
| 
| align=center| 1
| align=center| 4:12
| Saitama, Japan
| 
|-
| Win
| align=center| 31–7–2
| Hidehiko Hasegawa
| Decision (unanimous)
| Yarennoka! 
| 
| align=center| 3
| align=center| 5:00
| Saitama, Japan
| 
|-
| Win
| align=center| 30–7–2
| Mac Danzig
| KO (punch)
| PRIDE 33
| 
| align=center| 2
| align=center| 4:01
| Las Vegas, Nevada, United States
| 
|-
| Win
| align=center| 29–7–2
| Luciano Azevedo
| TKO (doctor stoppage)
| Pride - Bushido 12
| 
| align=center| 1
| align=center| 4:35
| Nagoya, Japan
| 
|-
| Win
| align=center| 28–7–2
| Olaf Alfonso
| KO (punch)
| Pride - Bushido 11
| 
| align=center| 1
| align=center| 1:54
| Saitama, Japan
| 
|-
| Loss
| align=center| 27–7–2
| Takanori Gomi
| KO (punches)
| Pride FC: Shockwave 2005
| 
| align=center| 1
| align=center| 3:56
| Saitama, Japan
| 
|-
| Win
| align=center| 27–6–2
| Joachim Hansen
| Decision (unanimous)
| Pride: Bushido 9
| 
| align=center| 2
| align=center| 5:00
| Tokyo, Japan
| 
|-
| Win
| align=center| 26–6–2
| Jens Pulver
| TKO (punches)
| Pride: Bushido 9
| 
| align=center| 1
| align=center| 8:56
| Tokyo, Japan
| 
|-
| Win
| align=center| 25–6–2
| Shinya Aoki
| Decision (unanimous)
| Shooto: Alive Road
| 
| align=center| 3
| align=center| 5:00
| Yokohama, Japan
| 
|-
| Win
| align=center| 24–6–2
| Milton Vieira
| Decision (split)
| Pride: Bushido 7
| 
| align=center| 2
| align=center| 5:00
| Tokyo, Japan
| 
|-
| Loss
| align=center| 23–6–2
| Crosley Gracie
| Submission (armbar)
| PRIDE Bushido 5
| 
| align=center| 2
| align=center| 1:02
| Osaka, Japan
| 
|-
| Win
| align=center| 23–5–2
| Brady Fink
| Submission (guillotine choke)
| PRIDE Bushido 4
| 
| align=center| 1
| align=center| 4:08
| Nagoya, Japan
| 
|-
| Loss
| align=center| 22–5–2
| Rodrigo Gracie
| Decision (unanimous)
| PRIDE Bushido 2
| 
| align=center| 2
| align=center| 5:00
| Yokohama, Japan
| 
|-
| Win
| align=center| 22–4–2
| Daiju Takase
| Decision (unanimous)
| PRIDE Shockwave 2003
| 
| align=center| 3
| align=center| 5:00
| Saitama, Japan
| 
|-
| Loss
| align=center| 21–4–2
| Ryo Chonan
| TKO (cut)
| Deep - 12th Impact
| 
| align=center| 3
| align=center| 2:10
| Japan
| 
|-
| Win
| align=center| 21–3–2
| Dave Menne
| TKO (cut)
| DEEP: 10th Impact
| 
| align=center| 2
| align=center| 2:02
| Japan
| 
|-
| Win
| align=center| 20–3–2
| Ryuki Ueyama
| Decision (unanimous)
| Deep - 8th Impact
| 
| align=center| 3
| align=center| 5:00
| Japan
| 
|-
| Loss
| align=center| 19–3–2
| Jake Shields
| Decision (unanimous)
| Shooto: Year End Show 2002
| 
| align=center| 3
| align=center| 5:00
| Tokyo, Japan
| 
|-
| Loss
| align=center| 19–2–2
| Matt Hughes
| TKO (strikes)
| UFC 36
| 
| align=center| 4
| align=center| 3:01
| Las Vegas, United States
| 
|-
| Win
| align=center| 19–1–2
| Dan Gilbert
| Submission (heel hook)
| Shooto: To The Top Final Act
| 
| align=center| 1
| align=center| 1:52
| Tokyo, Japan
| 
|-
| Loss
| align=center| 18–1–2
| Anderson Silva
| Decision (unanimous)
| Shooto: To The Top 7
| 
| align=center| 3
| align=center| 5:00
| Japan
| 
|-
| Win
| align=center| 18–0–2
| Jean Louis Alberch
| Decision
| GT: Golden Trophy 2001
| 
| align=center| 2
| align=center| 3:00
| France
| 
|-
| Win
| align=center| 17–0–2
| Frank Trigg
| KO (knees)
| Shooto: R.E.A.D. Final
| 
| align=center| 2
| align=center| 2:25
| Tokyo, Japan
| 
|-
| Win
| align=center| 16–0–2
| Luiz Azeredo
| Decision (unanimous)
| Shooto: R.E.A.D. 8
| 
| align=center| 3
| align=center| 5:00
| Osaka, Japan
| 
|-
| Win
| align=center| 15–0–2
| Tetsuji Kato
| Decision (split)
| Shooto: R.E.A.D. 2
| 
| align=center| 3
| align=center| 5:00
| Tokyo, Japan
| 
|-
| Win
| align=center| 14–0–2
| Haroldo Bunn
| TKO (punches)
| VTJ 1999: Vale Tudo Japan 1999
| 
| align=center| 3
| align=center| 1:31
| Tokyo, Japan
| 
|-
| Win
| align=center| 13–0–2
| Brad Aird
| Submission (armbar)
| Shooto: Renaxis 2
| 
| align=center| 1
| align=center| 0:37
| Tokyo, Japan
| 
|-
| Win
| align=center| 12–0–2
| Marcelo Aguiar
| Decision (unanimous)
| Shooto: 10th Anniversary Event
| 
| align=center| 3
| align=center| 5:00
| Yokohama, Japan
| 
|-
| Win
| align=center| 11–0–2
| Jean Louis Alberch
| Submission (armbar)
| GT: Golden Trophy 1999
| 
| align=center| 1
| align=center| 0:33
| France
| 
|-
| Win
| align=center| 10–0–2
| Damien Riccio
| Decision
| GT: Golden Trophy 1999
| 
| align=center| 1
| align=center| 5:00
| France
| 
|-
| Win
| align=center| 9–0–2
| James Schiavo
| Submission (toe hold)
| GT: Golden Trophy 1999
| 
| align=center| 1
| align=center| 0:26
| France
| 
|-
| Win
| align=center| 8–0–2
| Ademir Oliveira
| KO (flying knee)
| Shooto: Devilock Fighters
| 
| align=center| 1
| align=center| 0:34
| Tokyo, Japan
| 
|-
| Win
| align=center| 7–0–2
| Sergei Bytchkov
| Submission (armbar)
| VTJ 1998: Vale Tudo Japan 1998
| 
| align=center| 1
| align=center| 4:59
| Japan
| 
|-
| Win
| align=center| 6–0–2
| Ronny Rivano
| Submission (rear-naked choke)
| Shooto: Las Grandes Viajes 4
| 
| align=center| 1
| align=center| 1:10
| Tokyo, Japan
| 
|-
| Win
| align=center| 5–0–2
| Jutaro Nakao
| Decision (unanimous)
| Shooto: Las Grandes Viajes 3
| 
| align=center| 3
| align=center| 5:00
| Tokyo, Japan
| 
|-
| Draw
| align=center| 4–0–2
| Marcelo Aguiar
| Draw
| VTJ 1997: Vale Tudo Japan 1997
| 
| align=center| 3
| align=center| 8:00
| Japan
| 
|-
| Win
| align=center| 4–0–1
| Alex Cook
| Submission (rear naked choke)
| Shooto: Reconquista 4
| 
| align=center| 1
| align=center| 1:09
| Tokyo, Japan
| 
|-
| Win
| align=center| 3–0–1
| Ali Elias
| Submission (armbar)
| Shooto: Reconquista 3
| 
| align=center| 1
| align=center| 1:23
| Tokyo, Japan
| 
|-
| Win
| align=center| 2–0–1
| Hiroyuki Kojima
| Decision (unanimous)
| Shooto: Gig
| 
| align=center| 2
| align=center| 5:00
| Tokyo, Japan
| 
|-
| Draw
| align=center| 1–0–1
| Takuya Kuwabara
| Draw
| Shooto: Reconquista 1
| 
| align=center| 3
| align=center| 3:00
| Tokyo, Japan
| 
|-
| Win
| align=center| 1–0
| Caol Uno
| Submission (armbar)
| Shooto: Let's Get Lost
| 
| align=center| 1
| align=center| 2:52
| Tokyo, Japan
| 

Legend:

Mixed martial arts exhibition record

|-
| Draw
| align=center| 0-0-1
| Rumina Sato
| Technical Draw
| World＆Wild 1
| 
| align=center| 1
| align=center| 3:00
| Tokyo, Japan
| 
|-

Kickboxing record 

|-
|
|Win
|align=left| Jani Lax
|Shootboxing Battle Summit Ground Zero Tokyo 2007
|Tokyo, Japan
|Decision (unanimous)
|3
|3:00
|1-0
|-
|colspan=9 | Legend:   
|}

Submission grappling record
KO PUNCHES
|- style="text-align:center; background:#f0f0f0;"
| style="border-style:none none solid solid; "|Result
| style="border-style:none none solid solid; "|Opponent
| style="border-style:none none solid solid; "|Method
| style="border-style:none none solid solid; "|Event
| style="border-style:none none solid solid; "|Date
| style="border-style:none none solid solid; "|Round
| style="border-style:none none solid solid; "|Time
| style="border-style:none none solid solid; "|Notes
|-
|Loss|| Israel Alburquerque || Points || ADCC 2000 –77 kg|| 2000|| 1|| ||
|-
|Loss|| Roberto Traven || Points || ADCC 1999 Absolute|| 1999|| || 20:00||
|-
|Win|| Ricco Rodriguez || Points || ADCC 1999 Absolute|| 1999|| || 10:00||
|-
|Win|| Vinicius Magalhaes || Points || ADCC 1999 Absolute|| 1999|| || 15:00||
|-
|Win|| Eddie Ruiz || Submission || ADCC 1999 –77 kg|| 1999|| 1|| 00:17||
|-
|Loss|| Jean-Jacques Machado || Submission || ADCC 1999 –77 kg|| 1999|| 1|| 5:09||
|-
|Win|| Fabiano Iha || Points || ADCC 1999 –77 kg|| 1999|| || 10:00||
|-
|Win|| Andre Pederneiras ||  || ADCC 1999 –77 kg|| 1999|| || 15:00||
|-

References

External links
 
 Official blog
  PRIDE profile
 
 

1975 births
Living people
Japanese male mixed martial artists
Mixed martial artists utilizing shootfighting
Mixed martial artists utilizing shootboxing
Mixed martial artists utilizing judo
Mixed martial artists utilizing karate
Mixed martial artists utilizing catch wrestling
Mixed martial artists utilizing Brazilian jiu-jitsu
Japanese practitioners of Brazilian jiu-jitsu
People awarded a black belt in Brazilian jiu-jitsu
Welterweight mixed martial artists
Japanese male kickboxers
Middleweight kickboxers
Japanese submission wrestlers
Sportspeople from Ibaraki Prefecture
Japanese male judoka
Japanese catch wrestlers
Ultimate Fighting Championship male fighters